Louis Henri Boussenard (4 October 1847, Escrennes, Loiret – 11 September 1910 in Orléans) was a French author of adventure novels, dubbed "the French Rider Haggard" during his lifetime, but better known today in Eastern Europe than in Francophone countries.  As a measure of his popularity, 40 volumes of his collected works were published in Imperial Russia in 1911.

A physician by profession, Boussenard travelled throughout the French colonies, especially in Africa.  He was drafted during the Franco-Prussian War but soon capitulated to the Prussian soldiers, a bitter experience that could explain a nationalist flavour present in many of his novels.  Some of his books demonstrate a certain prejudice against Britons and Americans, a fact which likely contributed to his obscurity and lack of translations in the English-speaking world.

The author's picaresque humour flourished in his earliest books, À travers Australie: Les dix millions de l'Opossum rouge (1879), Le tour du monde d'un gamin de Paris (1880), Les Robinsons de la Guyane (1882), Aventures périlleuses de trois Français au pays des diamants (1884, set in a mysterious cavern underneath the Victoria Falls), The Crusoes of Guyana; or, The White Tiger (1885), and Les étrangleurs du Bengale (1901).

Boussenard's best-known book Le Capitaine Casse-Cou (1901) was set at the time of the Boer War.  L'île en feu (1898) fictionalized Cuba's struggle for independence.  Aspiring to emulate Jules Verne, Boussenard also turned out several science fiction novels, notably Les secrets de monsieur Synthèse (1888) and Dix mille ans dans un bloc de glace (1890), both translated by Brian Stableford in 2013 under the title Monsieur Synthesis

References

External links
 
 

1847 births
1911 deaths
People from Loiret
French science fiction writers
19th-century French novelists
20th-century French novelists
20th-century French male writers
French explorers
French male novelists
19th-century French male writers
1911 suicides
French military personnel of the Franco-Prussian War